Tiffany Monique Ryan is an American singer, songwriter, and background vocalist. She released her debut EP, Nemesis in June 2010 and followed with various single releases in 2011 and 2016. She has performed as a background vocalist for Beyoncé as one of "The Mamas" since 2007. In 2018, she became the lead background vocalist and the assistant vocal arranger/choir director for Beyoncé's performance at the Coachella Valley Music and Arts Festival in California's Coachella Valley. She is a five-year esophageal cancer survivor.

Early life 
Monique was born to Martha Ann Marshall (née Johnson) and Jerry Lee Marshall in Hermitage, Tennessee. She was musically influenced at an early age by her aunt, Beverly, who was a singer, musician and a former backing vocalist for Chaka Khan. At the age of three, Monique sang her first church solo, "Soon and Very Soon", while still living in Tennessee. Following the divorce of her parents, Monique and her mother moved to Newark, New Jersey, to stay with her maternal grandparents. Shortly after arriving to New Jersey, Monique began attending Tabernacle Baptist Church in Newark and joined the children's choir.

Monique attended Immaculate Conception High School in Montclair, New Jersey. There, she was an honor student, as well as a cheerleader, member of the track team and founder of the school's gospel choir. She graduated from Immaculate in 1995. After high school, Monique was awarded a full scholarship to Morgan State University in Baltimore, Maryland, where she majored in music education. After a brief hiatus, Monique transferred to William Paterson University in Wayne, New Jersey, in 2000, where she changed her major to Journalism and graduated in 2004.

Background vocalist 
While attending Morgan State University, Monique was approached by a friend to join a local singing group, OnPoint. After agreeing to join the group, Monique performed with OnPoint from 1997 to 1999. OnPoint was featured on K-Ci & JoJo's "Fee Fie Foe Fum" Remix on MCA Records in 1998. The group disbanded in 1999 citing creative differences.

Monique worked as an administrative assistant from 2002 to 2006 at a pharmaceutical company, while continuing to pursue music part time. During that period, she expanded her resume as a professional singer by performing as a backing vocalist for Mariah Carey, Christina Aguilera, Regina Belle, and Jeff Fox. In March 2007, while working at the pharmaceutical company, Monique was contacted by Beyoncé's music director and asked to join the band for Beyoncé's upcoming tour, The Beyoncé Experience. Monique immediately resigned from the pharmaceutical company and joined the band. She has performed with Beyoncé & The Mamas for a total of seven tours, including the Beyoncé Experience Tour (2007), I Am...Sasha Fierce Tour (2009), the I Am... Yours performance in Las Vegas, Mrs. Carter Show World Tour, On The Run Tour and The Formation World Tour. She also performed with her for the 2013 Super Bowl halftime show and several other iconic performances.

Monique was promoted to assistant vocal arranger and lead background vocalist for Beyoncé in 2018. Since her promotion, she trained and arranged the choir that was assembled for Beyoncé's Coachella "Beychella" performances in Palm Springs, CA. She was also the lead background vocalist for Beyonce and Jay-Z's "On The Run 2" World Tour and performed as lead background vocalist and assistant vocal arranger with the singer for Kobe Bryant's memorial at the Staple Center in 2020.

As a veteran background vocalist for many recording artist, Tiffany's story as a background vocalist was highlighted in in 20 Feet From Stardom, which won Best Music Film in 2014 for the Grammy Awards and an Academy Awards for Best Documentary Feature.

Solo career 
Following the I Am...Sasha Fierce Tour, Monique began her career as a solo recording artist. She released the EP Nemesis" in June 2010, which featured five songs written by her and produced by her then friend and producer, Kwiz. In July of that same year, Monique released her first music video, "Nemesis", via YouTube and social media. She released her second single and video, "Anytime", the following year.

Tiffany underwent a dramatic brand overhaul following the release of her debut EP, including an almost 100-lb weight loss. She became a spokespoerson for Sparkpeople and was also featured in the book Beyond Sugar Shock by Connie Bennett, which focused on persons who experienced improved health and fitness after conquering sugar addiction.

In March 2016, in celebration of her 1-year cancer treatment anniversary, Monique released "Braving The Storm", with proceeds from the song being donated to the American Cancer Society. In September 2016, Tiffany's husband, producer/composer Kwiz, released a socially-charged album entitled Blacklight Chronicles, which featured Monique on two of its best performing songs: "Pushin' On" and "After Amen".

In 2019, Monique's song "Nemesis", from her debut EP of the same title, regained success after being featured by the NBA during a James Harden highlight reel in March.

Personal life 
Monique married Jeffery Riddick Jr. in July 2000 and they had a son together in 2005. They divorced in 2010. In September 2016, Monique married Kevin "Kwiz" Ryan, a music producer and composer, in Riviera Maya, Mexico. They are also joint owners of Rhythm 252 Music Group.

She has spoken extensively about weight discrimination and obstacles she's encountered in the music industry as a plus-sized artist. In 2011, following some health concerns, she lost almost 100 pounds. In 2015, she was diagnosed with esophageal cancer and underwent extensive surgery as part of her treatment. She made a full recovery and celebrated five years cancer free on March 4, 2020.

Discography 
 Nemesis (EP) (2010)
 "I Feel A Spark" (single) (2011)
 "Braving The Storm" (single) (2016)

Filmography

References

External links 
 Tiffany Monique Official Website

African-American women singer-songwriters
American contemporary R&B singers
1977 births
Living people
Morgan State University alumni
People from Nashville, Tennessee
Singer-songwriters from New Jersey
Musicians from Newark, New Jersey
21st-century African-American women singers
Singer-songwriters from New York (state)